Martine is the title character in a series of books for children originally written in French by the Belgians Marcel Marlier and Gilbert Delahaye and published by Casterman. The first one, Martine à la ferme (Martine at the farm), was published in 1954, followed by 59 other books, which have been translated into many different languages. The book series has sold about 100 million copies and is one of the best-selling book series. When the author Gilbert Delahaye died in 1997, Jean-Louis Marlier, the son of Marcel Marlier, continued to write the stories. The series ended in 2011 when the illustrator Marcel Marlier died at the age of 80. The last book is the 60th, Martine et le prince mystérieux, published in 2010.

Two video games were released in Europe based on the character; however, the character was renamed "Emma" for English-speaking audiences in Europe and "Debbie" for the U.S. market. The games are based on the first and eighth books respectively. The games were recently announced for the U.S.

Albums

References

French children's books
Female characters in literature
Child characters in literature
Characters in children's literature
Literary characters introduced in 1954
Novels adapted into video games